Assassination Tango is a 2002 American crime thriller film written, produced, directed by, and starring Robert Duvall. Other actors include Rubén Blades, Kathy Baker and Duvall's Argentine wife, Luciana Pedraza. Francis Ford Coppola was one of the executive producers.

The film centers on the life of a hitman who travels to Argentina for a job, as well as his discovery of Argentine tango and his relationship with a woman living there. The film is considered a "labour of love" of Duvall, a self-confessed tango addict. Most of the film was shot in Buenos Aires, and some scenes at the beginning and end of the story were filmed in Coney Island, Brooklyn.

Plot
Anderson (Duvall) is a successful American hitman whose employer sends him to do a job in Argentina. His contacts inform him that his target is a former general who took part in Argentina's last military dictatorship. Following a phone call with one of the co-conspirators, Anderson learns that his job is delayed due to his target sustaining an injury in a riding accident.  Angry and frustrated that he is stuck in Argentina until the target is recovered from his accident, he walks the street and hears music behind a red curtain.  He finds that behind the curtain is a beautiful woman gracefully dancing the tango with a man. He is immediately entranced by the dancing and wants to learn more about it, which leads to his meeting with Manuela, a local tango dancer and instructor, and the woman he first saw behind the red curtain.

Things are not as easy as they seem. Although Anderson has immersed himself in the world of Manuela and dancing tango, he continues to prepare for and plan to assassinate the general. A paranoid Anderson simultaneously rents a room in two different hotels. From the safety but close proximity of one hotel room, he witnesses police converge on the other hotel. Anderson will fulfill his obligation to do the job despite the obvious reality that there is a leak. Although Anderson initially plans on shooting the general from the rooftops, he ends up pretending to deliver flowers while the general is in his backyard and shoots him point-blank in the heart.  The police investigate, bringing in the prostitute Anderson slept with, but she has no information on him.

Meanwhile, Anderson desperately tries to get a hold of his co-conspirators so that he can leave Argentina. Unknown to Anderson, his Argentinian co-conspirator Miguel (Rubén Blades) has been arrested by Buenos Aires police. Miguel is harshly interrogated, but can breathe a sigh of relief when his conspirator within the Argentinian federal authorities shows up.

Anderson, thinking that he has been abandoned and is stuck in Argentina plus will be found out for the general's murder, hides out in his room until he realizes that the joy he had with the tango was fleeting.  He suddenly remembers that he left the special boots he bought for his daughter, in the other rental room and risks his life to retrieve them.  He decides to try to go back home before he gets killed in Argentina.
Meanwhile, Manuela goes about her life with what appears to be her toddler daughter.

Although Anderson is almost stopped at the Argentinian airport, he eventually makes it out of Argentina safely. On the airplane back to the U.S., Anderson dreams about dancing the tango with Manuela. He makes it home to his family, showing them a few steps of the tango he learned, but right before he goes in the house he scans the area—just in case.

Cast
 Robert Duvall as John J. Anderson
 Luciana Pedraza as Manuela
 Kathy Baker as Maggie
 Rubén Blades as Miguel
 Katherine Micheaux Miller as Jenny
 Julio Oscar Mechoso as Orlando
 James Keane as Whitey
 Frank Gio as Frankie
 Frank Cassavetes as Jo Jo
 Michael Corrente as the policeman
 Raúl Outeda as Tony Manas
 Géraldine Rojas as Pirucha
 Elbio Nessier as General Humberto Rojas
 Marzenka Novak as Orlando's aunt

Reception
The film received a mixed reception, and currently has a 48% rotten rating on Rotten Tomatoes. Many critics criticized its slow pace and saw the film as nothing but personal self-indulgence from Duvall. Mick LaSalle of the San Francisco Chronicle called the film "vanity project" and said that it's "hard to see what Duvall thinks is so interesting about the hit man, aside from the fact that he's playing him". Michael Luongo of Frommer's stated that the film was slow-paced, but "highlights his [Duvall's] obsession with Argentina and the tango, letting the city [Buenos Aires] serve as the backdrop". Roger Ebert awarded the film three stars out four and although he said that the film is "not quite successful", he considered it a "fascinating effort". However, he said that Assassination Tango is "not entirely about crime or dance, and that will be a problem for some audiences, although the little girl skipping in the playground scene really steals the show". Amy K. Kaminsky  said that the film was "utterly personal", in that the "violence of the junta seems to be overshadowed by individual desire". She stated that the film masked "U.S. involvement in setting up dictatorships, teaching torture techniques, and underwriting state violence".

References

External links
 
 
 
 
 

2002 films
2002 crime thriller films
American Zoetrope films
2000s English-language films
English-language Argentine films
Films about contract killing
Films about Latin American military dictatorships
Films directed by Robert Duvall
Films shot in Argentina
2000s Spanish-language films
Films scored by Luis Bacalov
Films shot in Buenos Aires
Metro-Goldwyn-Mayer films
United Artists films
Tango films
2000s Argentine films